Deep Heat is the second studio album by Australian indie rock band Oh Mercy. The album was released in March 2011 and peaked at number 13 on the ARIA Charts.

At the ARIA Music Awards of 2011, the album was nominated for the ARIA Award for Breakthrough Artist – Album and ARIA Award for Best Cover Art.

Track listing 
 "Stay, Please Stay" - 3:04
 "Keith St" - 4:00
 "On the Run" - 3:25
 "Mercy Valley" - 3:42
 "Let Me Go" - 3:00
 "Hold Out Your Hand" - 3:21
 "Tenderness" - 4:04
 "Confessions" - 2:47
 "Blue Lagoon" - 3:59
 "What You Do" - 3:30
 "Doldrums" - 2:55

Chart

References 

2011 albums
Oh Mercy (band) albums